Arthur Hayes (born 1985) is an American entrepreneur, and a co-founder and former CEO of cryptocurrency exchange BitMEX. He graduated from the Wharton School of Business in 2008. Hayes was reported as being the youngest African American crypto billionaire in history. In 2022, Hayes pled guilty to United States Bank Secrecy Act violations and was sentenced to six months of home detention, two years of probation, and a $10 million fine.

Background
Hayes was born in Detroit, Michigan, to middle class parents who worked for General Motors. He attended Nichols School, a private preparatory school in Buffalo, New York, played varsity tennis and was a varsity cross-country runner, and graduated second in his class in 2004.  His family relocated to Buffalo after searching for a school that they felt would give him the environment to thrive as a student, and as an athlete.  Hayes has created scholarships for students so that they can experience the education that he received at Nichols. His mother Barbara Hayes was quoted as saying "Nichols gave him the setting, the stimulation, and at one point, the scholarship to thrive.”

Hayes has a B.S. in economics and finance from the Wharton School of Business at the University of Pennsylvania, which he earned in 2008. He later lived in Singapore.

Career

Deutsche Bank and Citigroup
Hayes moved to Hong Kong in 2008, to start his investment banking career.  He worked for Deutsche Bank, from 2008-11 as an equity derivatives trader, and for Citigroup for five years. He worked as the head ETF market maker for both firms. In 2011, Hayes left Deutsche Bank, and began working as a Delta one trader for Citibank in Hong Kong. In 2013 he was laid off.

BitMEX
He co-founded cryptocurrency exchange BitMEX in 2014 at 28 years of age with Ben Delo and Samuel Reed. It became one of the world's largest virtual currency derivatives exchanges. In 2021, its average daily trading volume was over $2 billion.

In March 2019, Hayes made a $2.24 million charitable contribution to the Jackie Robinson Foundation (JRF) Scholars program,  the largest-ever gift donated by an alumnus of its college scholars program. In April 2020 he announced that BitMex's operator was donating $2.5 million to four organizations working to fight the coronavirus pandemic.

Hayes was reported as being the youngest African American crypto billionaire in history.

In July 2019, in a public debate Nouriel Roubini called Hayes a "sleazy coward," and told him to "shut up."  Later that month Roubini wrote: "Crypto shitcoin-land is full of clueless, dumb financially illiterate ignorami who don't even get it when you make fun of them. No wonder as their heads are clogged into stinking cesspools of 1000s shitcoins ..."

Bank Secrecy Act violation

In October 2020, Hayes and his partners were each indicted by the U.S. Department of Justice. The charges by the DOJ in the case (United States vs Hayes et al) claimed that Hayes and partners did not register the company in the United States, and that they had 'thousands of US based customers'.The CFTC charged that the illegal operations enabled money laundering activity under the Bank Secrecy Act. BitMEX was the first crypto exchange to be charged under the Bank Secrecy Act. The laws require that transactions that are over $10,000 be reported. It is known as Know Your Customer (KYC) information.

Hayes stepped down from BitMex in October 2020. Alexander Hoptner replaced Hayes as CEO of BitMEX.

In April 2021, Hayes surrendered to United States authorities in Hawaii, and was released on bail. According to an article published in the Financial Insight Zambia Limited, on February 9, 2021, in their opinion Hayes' crime was that he refused to allow the CFTC to obtain the account information on Bitmex's customers. United States citizens used Virtual Private Network (VPN accounts) to set up BitMex accounts. Because the BitMEX platform was not registered in the U.S. or the Canadian province of Quebec their citizens were prohibited from using the platform. Citizens were able to mask their locations by using VPN networks. An article published in the Wall Street Journal on August 10, 2021, said that a settlement had been reached between BitMEX and the CFTC. BitMEX agreed to pay a $100 million fine to resolve the issue, without admitting or denying the charges. 

On February 24, 2022, Hayes, along with co-founders Benjamin Delo and Samuel Reed, and Gregory Dwyer pleaded guilty to "willfully failing to establish, implement, and maintain an anti-money laundering (“AML”) program at BitMEX."  Because Hayes was a first-time offender with a lengthy track record of charitable work, the Probation Department recommended a sentence of two years probation without any incarceration. Hayes was sentenced to six months of home confinement with two years probation; he also agreed to pay a $10 million dollar fine representing his pecuniary gain from the offense.

References

American expatriates in Singapore
1985 births
Deutsche Bank people
Hong Kong billionaires
Hong Kong businesspeople
Living people
People associated with cryptocurrency
People from Buffalo, New York
People from Detroit
Wharton School of the University of Pennsylvania alumni